Uiti Baker (born 2 September 1992) is a Cook Islands international rugby league footballer who plays as a  for the Souths Logan Magpies in the Queensland Cup.

Background
Baker was born in Wellington, New Zealand. He is of Samoan, Tokelau and Cook island descent.

Playing career
He is a Cook Islands international.

Baker was previously in the systems of the Newcastle Knights, Wests Tigers, Melbourne Storm, Canberra Raiders and the Manly Sea Eagles.

References

External links
League Unlimited profile
Fox Sports Pulse profile

1992 births
Living people
Cook Islands national rugby league team players
New Zealand sportspeople of Cook Island descent
New Zealand sportspeople of Samoan descent
New Zealand people of Tokelauan descent
New Zealand rugby league players
Rugby league players from Wellington City
Rugby league props
Western Suburbs Rosellas players